"Angels" is a song by the English singer-songwriter Robbie Williams. It was included on Williams's debut solo album, Life thru a Lens (1997), and released as a single on 1 December 1997. "Angels" was written by Williams and Guy Chambers, based on an earlier song written by Ray Heffernan.

Williams said he wrote "Angels" with Chambers about his aunt and uncle. Heffernan asserts that he wrote the first version in 1996, after his partner had a miscarriage, and finished it with Williams after meeting him by chance in Dublin. Williams confirmed that he had recorded a demo with Heffernan but said he rewrote the song significantly with Chambers. To avoid a lawsuit, Williams bought the rights to the song from Heffernan before it was released.

"Angels" is Williams's best-selling single, and the 34th-bestselling UK single of the 1990s. It was voted the best song of the previous 25 years at the 2005 Brit Awards, and in 2005 Britons voted "Angels" the song they most wanted played at their funeral. It has been covered by artists including Jessica Simpson, David Archuleta, Beverley Knight, All Angels, Declan Galbraith and Josh Groban. It was recorded in Spanish (as "Ángel") by the Mexican singers Yuridia and Marco Moré, and in Italian (as "Un Angelo") by Patrizio Buanne. Williams also recorded a Spanish version.

Writing
In 2011, Robbie Williams said he wrote "Angels" with his collaborator Guy Chambers in 25 minutes about his aunt and uncle. By his account, he and Chambers were sitting outside a cafe watching a water fountain, which inspired them to write the chorus. In 2016, Williams said: "It was the first of our songs that we wrote together. We could tell and hoped and prayed that we got something incredibly special." Williams expressed irritation that some assumed Chambers was the sole author.

The Irish singer-songwriter Ray Heffernan asserts that he wrote the first version of "Angels" in Paris in 1996, after his partner had a miscarriage. According to Heffernan, he met Williams in a pub by chance in Dublin. He showed him an incomplete version of the song, and that week the two recorded a studio demo. Williams confirmed that he had recorded a demo with Heffernan but said he rewrote the song significantly with Chambers.

Before the song's release, Heffernan accepted an offer from Williams's management to buy the rights for £7,500. He is thanked in the UK CD2 single liner notes. Williams said: "We could have gone to court, and it all would have been down to whether what way the judge wakes up that day out of bed ... So I gave him some money, and he went away." In 2011, Heffernan said: "For a long time, I was angry about this, but as you get older you see things differently ... the 'Angels' connection has opened doors to publishing companies and earned me a few quid."

Chart performance
"Angels" was the 38th-best-selling single of 1997 in the UK and the 26th of 1998. It was the 34th-bestselling UK single of the decade. Despite only reaching a peak of No. 4, it is Williams's bestselling UK single and according to Official UK Charts Company figures passed the million sales mark in June 2009, with a combination of both physical and download sales. It has sold 1.8 million copies in the UK as of April 2021. It was released in 1999 in the US, after Williams' debut there with "Millennium". "Angels" re-entered the ARIA Top 100 at No. 91, on 5 May 2008. After announcing his XXV album in June 2022, and releasing a reworked version of "Angels", titled "Angels (XXV)", the song placed at number 92 on the UK Official Singles Sales Chart on 10 June.

Critical reception
The Scottish newspaper Aberdeen Press and Journal wrote that "Angels" is "perhaps the strongest cut" from the Life thru a Lens album. John Bush from AllMusic noted Williams' "crooning". Larry Flick from Billboard described it as a "sweet ballad that never gets sappy". He noted that the production is "first-rate, the lyric is thoughtful and ear-grabbing, and his smoky, crisp vocal is a sheer delight. All that and a chorus to kill for." Daily Record wrote, "The ex-Take That star shows he has come of age with this melodic pop ballad." They also added, "Surprisingly grown-up sounding Robbie on what is his best tune to date." Irish Independent called it an "epic ballad". 

Music & Media commented that "with songs of the quality of Angels, Robbie Williams is on his way towards extending his audience by drawing in older listeners." They also added that it "distinguishes itself from its indie rock inspired predecessors 'Old Before I Die' and 'Lazy Days' by exchanging their guitars for a more mellow, piano-based arrangement." Music Week gave it four out of five, likening it to Elton John and saying it suggested that Williams would be more successful than his old Take That bandmate Gary Barlow. Dave Fawbert from ShortList declared it "genuinely brilliant", with a "a pretty understated vocal from Robbie. Nothing too over the top, just sincere." In 2003, Q ranked "Angels" the 237th-best song.

The Guardian wrote in 2022 that "Angels was so ubiquitous for so long that it is almost impossible for anyone of a certain age to listen to it objectively: throughout the late 90s and 00s, it wasn’t so much a song as an unavoidable fact of daily life. Most pop songwriters would kill to come up with something with such impact and longevity."

Awards
At the 2005 Brit Awards, "Angels" was voted by the British public the best song in the past 25 years of British music, though it had only reached number four on the singles chart. Williams performed the song live with Joss Stone then. In a 2005 survey by UK digital TV station Music Choice, Britons chose it as the song they would most like played at their funeral.

Music video
The accompanying music video for "Angels" was directed by Vaughan Arnell, and filmed at Saunton Sands. Filmed largely from the air, Williams walks around a beach, stares at the sky, kicks a football and rides a motorbike with a woman while a helicopter flies around them.

Live performances

In 2009, Williams performed "Angels" at the final of the sixth series of The X Factor with Olly Murs. On 14 June 2018, Williams performed "Angels" with Russian soprano Aida Garifullina at the 2018 FIFA World Cup opening ceremony held at the Luzhniki Stadium in Moscow, Russia. On 23 June 2018, Williams performed the song as a special guest at American singer-songwriter Taylor Swift's Reputation Stadium Tour concert at Wembley Stadium in London.

Formats and track listings

 UK CD1
 "Angels" – 4:24
 "Karaoke Overkill" – 3:31
 "Get the Joke" – 3:03
 "Angels" (acoustic version) – 4:27

 UK CD2 and cassette single
 "Angels" – 4:24
 "Back for Good" (live version) – 3:59
 "Walk This Sleigh" – 3:01

 European CD single
 "Angels" – 4:24
 "Walk This Sleigh" – 3:01

 Australian CD single (1997)
 "Angels" – 4:24
 "Karaoke Overkill" – 3:31
 "Get the Joke" – 3:03

 Australian CD single (1999)
 "Angels" – 4:24
 "It's Only Us" – 2:50
 "Angels" (live) – 5:39
 "Let Me Entertain You" (live at The Brits '99) – 4:41
 "Millennium" – 4:05

Credits and personnel
Credits are taken from the Life thru a Lens album booklet.

Studios
 Recorded at Matrix Maison Rouge (London, England)
 Mixed at Battery Studios (London, England)

Personnel

 Robbie Williams – writing, vocals
 Guy Chambers – writing, keyboards, production, arrangement
 Gary Nuttall – backing vocals, guitar
 Andre Barreau – backing vocals, guitar
 Nicole Patterson – backing vocals
 Chester Kamen – guitar
 Mark Smith – bass, programming
 Steve Power – keyboards, production, mixing, programming
 Chris Sharrock – drums
 Andy Duncan – percussion
 London Session Orchestra – orchestra
 Gavyn Wright – concertmaster
 Jim Brumby – Battery Studios assistant
 Matt Hay – Matrix Maison Rouge assistant

Charts

Weekly charts

Year-end charts

Certifications

Release history

Cover versions

Jessica Simpson

Jessica Simpson's cover of "Angels" was the fourth and final single released from her album In This Skin in 2004. It was produced by Billy Mann.

Music video
The video for "Angels" opens a visibly anxious Simpson on an empty stage rehearsing for a performance. She can be seen in intercut scenes staring into space, as if she has lost her self-confidence and ability to perform. As the song progresses, however, white roses can be seen scattered around her as a sign of hope, and soon Simpson begins to regain her confidence. The song then shifts into its instrumental bridge to correlate with the emotions of the characters, as Simpson proceeds to climb to the top of the building for her final performance. There she is greeted by a youth orchestra, and finishes the song.

Chart performance
Simpson's version of "Angels" failed to break into the Billboard Hot 100 (though it did reach number six on the Bubbling Under Hot 100 Singles). However, the song did become a moderate success on the Top 40 Mainstream and Hot Digital Tracks charts. Both Simpson, and her father and manager Joe Simpson, had hoped this song would lead to her first Grammy nomination, as Britney Spears and Christina Aguilera, her 1990s rivals, had each already been nominated as well as winning. The song's downloads were not allowed to help it.

Track listing
 "Angels"
 "Angels" (Stealth Remix)
 "Fly" (B-side)
 "Angels" (enhanced video)

Remixes
 "Angels" (album version) – 4:00
 "Angels" (Dave Anthony Remix) – 4:53
 "Angels" (Junior Vasquez World Mixshow) – 6:32
 "Angels" (Stealth Remix) – 3:12
 "Angels" (acoustic) – 4:07

Charts

Release history

Yuridia

In 2005, Yuridia, former contestant of the popular Mexican show La Academia, released "Ángel", a Spanish version of the song which she had interpreted during her stay in the reality show, as her debut and lead single. In Mexico, as well as in other parts of Latin America, "Ángel", became an instant hit, leading her debut album of almost the same name to achieve Diamond status in Mexico and becoming one of the most recent best selling Mexican singers and the best female Mexican seller of the past decade. The singer received two gold certifications for 20,000 copies sold in Mexico.

Chart performance
"Ángel" reached 32 on the Billboard Hot Latin Songs chart and La Voz de un Angel managed to climb into the top 20 on the Billboard Hot Latin Albums chart, peaking at 16. In Mexico the song became the most successful song of 2005, leading the charts during 13 week.

Charts

David Archuleta

David Archuleta initially covered this song during the 7th season of American Idol, in 2008. A studio version of this cover was produced and made available for purchase as a digital download exclusively via iTunes Store for a limited period.

Later in that year, he decided to re-record the song, with a different arrangement and production, for his debut album. The version is also available for digital purchase since 27 October 2008, when it was released to help promote the pre-order of Archuleta's album.

Formats and track listings
Digital download
 "Angels" (main version) — 4:09
 "Angels" (promotional version) — 3:33

Chart performance
Archuleta's version of the song has become the second highest charting version in the United States after the original performed by Robbie Williams. It managed to enter the Billboard Hot 100 at #89 due to digital downloads. On the Canadian Hot 100 the song peaked at #64.

Charts

Blessing Chitapa

In November 2020, Blessing Chitapa, winner of the ninth series of The Voice UK, released a cover version of "Angels" as her winner's single. The song is included on Chitapa’s debut album, Count My Blessings.

On 14 November 2020, Chitapa performed the song "Angels" live on The Voice UK grand final, with the single being released after the show was finished as a digital download.

Charts

Release history

Other notable versions 
 In June 2021, an artist collective named Kindred Spirit that included Glen Matlock, Steve Norman, Marcella Detroit, Earl Slick among others, released a cover version of the song titled "Angels (Of The Nations)" to both commemorate music producer Steve Brown who died in 2021 and raise money to offer angel sculptures as gifts to the families of UK doctors who died of Covid whilst working for the British NHS.

References

External links
 BBC Radio 2: Sold On Song on Angels
 BBC news article on the funeral choice of music

1997 songs
1997 singles
Brit Award for British Single
Robbie Williams songs
Rock ballads
2004 singles
Jessica Simpson songs
David Archuleta songs
Music videos directed by Samuel Bayer
Music videos directed by Matthew Rolston
Music videos directed by Vaughan Arnell
Black-and-white music videos
Pop ballads
Songs written by Guy Chambers
Songs written by Robbie Williams
Song recordings produced by Guy Chambers
Song recordings produced by Steve Power
Capitol Records singles
Chrysalis Records singles
Columbia Records singles
Sony BMG singles
Universal Music Group singles
Jive Records singles
Yuridia songs